is a train station in San'yō-Onoda, Yamaguchi Prefecture, Japan.

Lines 
West Japan Railway Company
Mine Line

Railway stations in Japan opened in 1921
Railway stations in Yamaguchi Prefecture